The King Alfonso XIII's Cup 1923 was the 23rd staging of the Copa del Rey, the Spanish football cup competition.

The competition started on 25 March 1923, and concluded on 13 May 1923, with the final, held at the Les Corts in Barcelona, in which Athletic Bilbao lifted the trophy for the ninth time with a 1–0 victory over CD Europa with Travieso netting the only goal of the match.

Teams
Biscay: Athletic Bilbao
Gipuzkoa: Real Sociedad
 Centre Region: Real Madrid
 South Region: Sevilla FC
Galicia: Real Vigo
Asturias: Sporting de Gijón
Catalonia: CE Europa
Levante: Valencia FC

Quarterfinals

|}
Tiebreaker (because of equality of points - 1 win each)

|}

First leg

Second leg

Athletic de Bilbao qualified for the semifinals 8–1 on agg.

CD Europa qualified for the semifinals 6–1 on agg.

Tie break

Semifinals

|}

First leg

Second leg

Athletic Bilbao qualified for the semifinals 2–0 on agg.

{{football box
| date = 29 April 1923
| team1 = Sporting Gijón
| score = 1–2
| report = Report
| team2 = CD Europa'| goals1 = Palacios 
| goals2 = Pellicer Julià 
| stadium = El Molinón, Gijón
| referee =  José Murguía
}}CD Europa qualified for the semifinals 5–3 on agg.''

Final

References

External links
Linguasport.com
RSSSF.com

1923
1923 domestic association football cups
Copa